The 2007 amendment to the Constitution of Kazakhstan modified Kazakhstan's basic law, on May 18, 2007. The changes followed the conclusion of the activities of the 'State Commission on Democratization' formed two years previously.

In a speech on May 16 to the Joint Session of the Chambers of Parliament, President Nursultan Nazarbayev summarized the development of Kazakhstan since independence in 1991, and outlined his proposed constitutional changes.

The main changes proposed by the President were as follows:
The reduction of the presidential term from 7-years to 5-years, coming into effect after the next election in 2012
To adopt proportional representation for the Majilis, or lower Chamber of deputies
To increase the number of senators selected by the President, from 7 to 15
To give to the Senate the power of consultation on the appointment of a President of the National Bank
To increase the number of Majilis deputies to 107 - 98 deputies elected by proportional representation and 9 deputies representing the Assembly of the Peoples' of Kazakhstan. The total number of the parliamentary deputies will therefore increase by 38 and will amount to 154
To strengthen the powers of political parties by depriving members of the Majilis of their mandate in the event that they are expelled from their party
To make the government accountable not only to the Head of State, but to the whole Parliament; by giving the Government a vote of no-confidence. It will be sufficient for the Majilis to have a simple majority of deputies' votes compared with the previously required two thirds of votes, in order to dismiss the government
To change, the procedure for forming the Constitutional Council and the Central Election Commission. This will occur via the introduction of a law whereby two thirds of the Constitutional Council, the Central Election Commission and Auditing Committee will be formed by Parliament
To change the procedure of forming the Government, where the Prime Minister is appointed by the President, so that the approval of such appointments, and consequently that of the entire Government, is delegated to the Majilis
To introduce a change whereby the composition of the Government shall be formed according to the proposals of the Prime Minister. The Prime Minister will also represent the parliamentary majority party
To abolish the constitutional prohibition of state funding of NGO's
To develop a procedure for the partial funding of political parties from the state budget
To abolish the death penalty in Kazakhstan

In addition to these proposals the Kazakh parliament passed an additional amendment two days later, lifting the term-limit clause on the first President of Kazakhstan, Nursultan Nazarbayev.  The constitution limits a president to two five-year terms, but this amendment allows the incumbent president--Nazarbayev--to run for an unlimited number of five year terms.  Some critics argued this move paved the way for him to become de facto President for life.

See also
Government of Kazakhstan
Constitution of Kazakhstan

References

Kazakhstan
Law of Kazakhstan
Government of Kazakhstan
Constitution of Kazakhstan
Amendment to the Constitution of Kazakhstan